Dacrycarpus imbricatus is a species of conifer in the family Podocarpaceae. It is found in Cambodia, China, Fiji, Indonesia, Laos, Malaysia, Papua New Guinea, the Philippines, Thailand, Vanuatu, and Vietnam.

References

imbricatus
Least concern plants
Trees of China
Trees of Fiji
Trees of Indo-China
Trees of Malesia
Trees of New Guinea
Trees of Vanuatu
Taxonomy articles created by Polbot
Flora of the Borneo montane rain forests